The Kuching Cat Museum is a cat museum in Kuching, Sarawak, Malaysia. It was founded in 1993. It is owned by the Kuching North City Hall (DBKU).

History

The idea of building a cat museum was mooted by Sarawak chief minister Abdul Taib Mahmud and his wife Laila Taib.

Collections

There are four galleries containing over 4,000 artefacts including paintings and memorials related to cats. Exhibits include a mummified cat from ancient Egypt, a gallery of feline-related advertising, and the five species of wild cats found in Borneo. These artefacts were acquired from National Museum in Kuala Lumpur and were displayed for the first time on 1 August 1988 at Dewan Tun Abdul Razak, Putra World Trade Centre. The collections were handed over to DBKU after the completion of DBKU headquarters in 1992.

Structure
The museum is currently housed on the bottom floor of the Kuching North City Hall, located in Petra Jaya, about 20 minutes away from the Kuching Waterfront. The museum covers an area of 1,035 square metres on Bukit Siol which is 60 metres above sea level. The museum is RM1.00 for entry, which also includes a DBKU Cat Museum keychain.

See also

 List of museums in Malaysia

References

External links
 Tourism Malaysia - Cat Museum
 Introduction about Kuching Cat Museum
 Events on Kuching Cat Museum

Buildings and structures in Kuching
1993 establishments in Malaysia
Museums in Sarawak
Tourist attractions in Kuching
Cats in popular culture